No Sweat is the sixth album by the band Blood, Sweat & Tears, released in 1973.

By mid-1973, Steve Katz, one of the founding members of BS&T, had left the band as the members leaned further towards jazz fusion. No Sweat continued in the jazz-fusion vein and featured intricate horn work.

No Sweat was re-released on CD in 2005 on the Wounded Bird label.

Production
No Sweat was produced by Steve Tyrell. Paul Buckmaster was brought in to provide string arrangements.

Reception
AllMusic critic Ross Boissoneau wrote that the album "may be the jazziest BS&T ever." The critic for the Daily Herald wrote that "[Jerry] Fisher's gravelly voice seems the perfect replacement and, while I at first thought he tried too much to sound like Clayton-Thomas, he now appears to have evolved a strong singing style of his own."

Track listing
"Roller Coaster" (Mark James) – 3:23
"Save Our Ship" (Georg Wadenius, Cynthia Weil) – 3:43
"Django (An Excerpt)" (John Lewis) – 2:08
"Rosemary" (Randy Newman) – 3:13
"Song for John" (Lou Marini) – 2:53
"Almost Sorry" (Jeff Kent, Doug Lubahn) – 6:26
"Back Up Against the Wall" (Buddy Buie, James Cobb) – 3:21
"Hip Pickles" (Marini) – 1:31
"My Old Lady" (Wadenius, Weil) – 3:15
"Empty Pages" (Jim Capaldi, Steve Winwood) – 3:15
"Mary Miles" (Michael Rabon) – 2:26
"Inner Crisis" (Larry Willis) – 5:40

Personnel
Jerry Fisher – vocals
Dave Bargeron - trombone, tuba, bass trombone, baritone horn, background vocals
Bobby Colomby - drums, percussion, background vocals
Jim Fielder - bass, background vocals
Lou Marini - woodwinds
Lew Soloff - trumpet
Tom Malone – trumpet, ARP, 12-String fiddle
Georg Wadenius – guitar, background vocals
Larry Willis – keyboards

Additional musicians
Paul Buckmaster – synthesizer, ARP, horn arrangements, string arrangements, string conductor
David Hentschel – synthesizer, ARP
Steve Katz – guitar
Chuck Winfield - trumpet, flugelhorn, French horn
Jimmy Maelen – percussion
Frank Ricotti – percussion
Joshie Armstead – background vocals
Valerie Simpson – background vocals
Maretha Stewart – background vocals

Charts

References

Blood, Sweat & Tears albums
1973 albums
Albums arranged by Paul Buckmaster
Columbia Records albums
Albums recorded at Trident Studios
Albums recorded at Electric Lady Studios